Olhuveli as a place name may refer to:
 Olhuveli (Dhaalu Atoll) (Republic of Maldives)
 Olhuveli (Kaafu Atoll) (Republic of Maldives)
 Olhuveli (Laamu Atoll) (Republic of Maldives)